George Vasey may refer to:

George Alan Vasey  (1895–1945), Australian World War II major general
George Vasey (botanist) (1822–1893), English-born U.S. botanist and graminologist
George Vasey (cricketer) (1880–1951), English cricketer and educator